Eero Virtanen (22 October 1915 – 1 June 2003) was a Finnish wrestler. He competed in the men's Greco-Roman lightweight at the 1948 Summer Olympics.

References

External links
 

1915 births
2003 deaths
Finnish male sport wrestlers
Olympic wrestlers of Finland
Wrestlers at the 1948 Summer Olympics
Sportspeople from Jyväskylä